Milorad Bilbija (born 17 July 1964) is a Bosnian former professional footballer who played as a defender and current football manager.

Club career
Born in Sanski Most, SR Bosnia and Herzegovina, back then still within Yugoslavia, he played for almost a decade with FK Borac Banja Luka in the Yugoslav First and Second Leagues. Next, he had a spell alongside compatriot Elvir Bolić at Gaziantepspor in the Turkish Super Lig. Then, he joined Serbian club OFK Kikinda playing with them in the 1993–94 First League of FR Yugoslavia.

Personal life
Bilbija's son, Nemanja, is also a professional footballer who currently plays for Bosnian Premier League club Zrinjski Mostar.

Honours

Player
Borac Banja Luka 
Yugoslav Cup: 1987–88
Mitropa Cup: 1992

References

External sources
 Interview on Borac B.Luka official website. 
 Stats from Borac Banja Luka

1964 births
Living people
People from Sanski Most
Serbs of Bosnia and Herzegovina
Association football defenders
Yugoslav footballers
Bosnia and Herzegovina footballers
FK Borac Banja Luka players
Gaziantepspor footballers
OFK Kikinda players
FK Sloboda Novi Grad players
Yugoslav First League players
Süper Lig players
First League of Serbia and Montenegro players
Bosnia and Herzegovina expatriate footballers
Expatriate footballers in Turkey
Bosnia and Herzegovina expatriate sportspeople in Turkey